Robert Griffin (July 31, 1902 – December 19, 1960) was an American film and television actor. He appeared in over 100 films and television programs, including Gunsmoke in 1957, and was known for playing the role of Doc Wardrobe in the 1956 film The Brass Legend.

Partial filmography 

 Barricade (1950) - Kirby
 Destination Big House (1950) - Police Official (uncredited)
 Broken Arrow (1950) - John Lowrie (uncredited)
 Joe Palooka in the Squared Circle (1950) - Kebo (Crawford Henchman)
 The Magnificent Yankee (1950) - Court Crier (uncredited)
 Vengeance Valley (1951) - Cal (uncredited)
 The Unknown Man (1951) - Reporter (uncredited)
 Indian Uprising (1952) - Dan Avery (uncredited)
 Love Is Better Than Ever (1952) - Mr. Shaw (uncredited)
 Rancho Notorious (1952) - Politician in Jail Cell (uncredited)
 Montana Territory (1952) - Yeager
 Serpent of the Nile (1953) - Brutus
 The Great Jesse James Raid (1953) - Morgan (uncredited)
 Conquest of Cochise (1953) - Sam Maddock
 Slaves of Babylon (1953) - King Astyages
 Gun Fury (1953) - Sheriff of Salt Wells (uncredited)
 The Great Diamond Robbery (1954) - Judge (uncredited)
 The Law vs. Billy the Kid (1954) - L. G. Murphy (uncredited)
 Dragnet (1954) - Chief Special Agent (uncredited)
 The Black Dakotas (1954) - Boggs (uncredited)
 The Human Jungle (1954) - Man (uncredited)
 Bad Day at Black Rock (1955) - Second Train Conductor (uncredited)
 Shotgun (1955) - Doctor (uncredited)
 Inside Detroit (1956) - Hoagy Mitchell
 Please Murder Me! (1956) - Lou Kazarian
 The Ten Commandments (1956) - High Priest (uncredited)
 The Brass Legend (1956) - Doc Ward
 Crime of Passion (1957) - Detective James
 Fury at Showdown (1957) - Sheriff Clay
 Monster from Green Hell (1957) - Dan Morgan
 I Was a Teenage Werewolf (1957) - Police Chief Baker
 Gunsight Ridge (1957) - Herb Babcock
 Pawnee (1957) - Doc Morgan
 The Left Handed Gun (1958) - Morton
 Machine-Gun Kelly (1958) - Mr. Andrew Vito
 The Bravados (1958) - Banker Loomis (uncredited)
 The Badlanders (1958) - Bartender (uncredited)
 No Place to Land (1958) - Bart Pine
 A Summer Place (1959) - Engelhardt (uncredited)
 Ice Palace (1960) - Engineer (uncredited)

References

External links 

Rotten Tomatoes profile

1902 births
1960 deaths
People from Hutchinson, Kansas
Male actors from Kansas
American male film actors
American male television actors
20th-century American male actors
Male Western (genre) film actors
Western (genre) television actors